The Undomestic Goddess is Sophie Kinsella's second "stand-alone" novel, published by Dial Press Trade Paperback in April 2006 (UK).

Plot
Workaholic attorney Samantha Sweeting has just done the unthinkable:  she's made a huge mistake.  A mistake so huge, it'll wreck any chance of a partnership.

Going into utter meltdown, she walks out of her London office, gets on a train, and ends up in the middle of nowhere. Asking for directions at a big, beautiful house, she's mistaken for an interviewee and finds herself being offered a job as housekeeper. Her employers have no idea they've hired a lawyer – and Samantha has no idea how to work the oven. She can't sew on a button, bake a potato, or get the ironing board to open. How she takes a deep breath and begins to cope – and finds love – is a story as delicious as the bread she learns to bake.

Film adaptation
Universal is adapting the book and has just signed a director, Andy Fickman to the project.  He was the director of The Game Plan, Race to Witch Mountain, She's the Man and You Again, amongst others.

Aline Brosh McKenna has written the script for the film.

References

External links
 Sophie Kinsella, UK Website
 Sophie Kinsella, US Website
 http://www.sophiekinsella.co.uk/books/stand-alone-novels/The-Undomestic-Goddess

2005 British novels
Novels by Madeline Wickham
Chick lit novels
Bantam Press books